Allison Joy Courtenay (née Langer, born May 22, 1974) commonly known as A. J. Langer, is a retired American actress andsince 2015the Countess of Devon. She is most known for playing Caroline Larkin in season 2 of Baywatch and as Rayanne Graff on the television series My So-Called Life.

Early years
Allison Joy Langer was born in Columbus, Ohio, daughter of Deana, an audiologist who owned a hearing aid distribution company, and Gary Langer, who worked in sales for a wholesale fashion distributor. She moved to the San Fernando Valley with her family at age five. When she joined an otherwise all-boys baseball team at age eight, her teammates considered the name "Allison" to be too feminine, and began calling her by her initials, "A.J." She has one older brother, Kirk.

Career
After recurring roles on several television shows, including The Wonder Years, Baywatch and Drexell's Class, Langer was cast as Rayanne Graff on My So-Called Life. She also appeared in the cast of the sitcoms It's Like, You Know... and Three Sisters as well as the drama series Eyes. Her film appearances include John Carpenter's Escape From L.A. and Wes Craven's horror film The People Under the Stairs.

In 2011, after a six-year acting hiatus, Langer appeared in 14 episodes of Private Practice in the recurring role of Erica Warner. She left the show in 2012 following the death of her character.

Personal life
Langer married attorney Charles Courtenay, the son of Hugh Courtenay, 18th Earl of Devon, in a civil ceremony in 2004. A formal wedding took place on April 30, 2005, in Los Angeles, California. Until the death of her father-in-law, Langer held the courtesy title of Lady Courtenay. Following his death, and upon her husband's succession as 19th Earl of Devon, she assumed the title of Countess of Devon. In January 2014, she and her husband permanently relocated their family to London, and to the family seat at Powderham Castle in May 2015. The couple have two children, a daughter and a son:

 Lady Joscelyn Skye Courtenay
 Jack Haydon Langer Courtenay, Lord Courtenay

In her spare time, Langer raises awareness and money for the research and treatment of fibromyalgia, from which she herself suffers.

Filmography

Film

Television

References

External links

Living people
1974 births
20th-century American actresses
21st-century American actresses
Actresses from Columbus, Ohio
Actresses from Los Angeles
American child actresses
American film actresses
American people of German descent
American television actresses
People from the San Fernando Valley
American expatriate actresses in the United Kingdom
Devon
Jewish American actresses